Raichur University is a public university located in Raichur, Karnataka, India. The university is recognized by University Grants Commission.

History
Raichur University was established in 2021 by an Act of Karnataka State. Earlier it was a post-graduate centre of Gulbarga University,Kalaburagi.

Location
Raichur University is located on the national highway 167 near Yeragera village in Raichur district Karnataka India.it is covered by mountains and forest where we can experience good environment.

Description
Raichur University is a new university in Karnataka state of raichur district in India.under its official section has two major districts called yadgiri and raichur.
Colleges and pg centers of both yadgiri and raichur district belongs to Raichur University.

References

External links
Raichur University | Raichur District Website | India

Universities in Karnataka
Education in Raichur
Universities and colleges in Raichur district
Educational institutions established in 2021
2021 establishments in Karnataka
Public universities in India